Tatiana Mezinova, (Russian: Татьяна Мезинова), is a paralympic athlete from Russia competing mainly in category F44 throwing events.

Career 
Tatiana has competed at three Paralympic games in 1996, 2000 and 2004.  She won a silver medal in the javelin in the 1996 games in Atlanta as well as competing in the shot and discus.  In 2000 she restricted herself to the shot and javelin, winning a bronze medal in both events before returning to all three throws in 2004 where she failed to add to her medal haul.

References 

Paralympic athletes of Russia
Athletes (track and field) at the 1996 Summer Paralympics
Athletes (track and field) at the 2000 Summer Paralympics
Athletes (track and field) at the 2004 Summer Paralympics
Paralympic silver medalists for Russia
Paralympic bronze medalists for Russia
Living people
Medalists at the 1996 Summer Paralympics
Medalists at the 2000 Summer Paralympics
Year of birth missing (living people)
Paralympic medalists in athletics (track and field)
Russian female javelin throwers
Russian female shot putters
20th-century Russian women
21st-century Russian women
Javelin throwers with limb difference
Shot putters with limb difference
Paralympic javelin throwers
Paralympic shot putters